Subagja is an Indonesian name. Notable people with this name include:

 Ahmad Subagja Baasith (born 1996), Indonesian football player
 Ricky Subagja (born 1971), Indonesian badminton player
 Riyanto Subagja (born 1993), Indonesian badminton player

Indonesian-language surnames